Blayde Capell (born 3 June 1997) is a South African cricketer. He made his first-class debut for KwaZulu-Natal in the 2016–17 Sunfoil 3-Day Cup on 20 October 2016. He made his List A debut for KwaZulu-Natal in the 2017–18 CSA Provincial One-Day Challenge on 15 October 2017.

In September 2018, he was named in KwaZulu-Natal's squad for the 2018 Africa T20 Cup. He made his Twenty20 debut for KwaZulu-Natal in the 2018 Africa T20 Cup on 14 September 2018. In September 2019, he was named in KwaZulu-Natal's squad for the 2019–20 CSA Provincial T20 Cup. In April 2021, he was named in South Western Districts' squad, ahead of the 2021–22 cricket season in South Africa.

References

External links
 

1997 births
Living people
South African cricketers
KwaZulu-Natal cricketers
Cricketers from Pietermaritzburg